Peelamedu is a major commercial centre and residential locality in the Eastern part of the city of Coimbatore in Tamil Nadu, India. It is governed by Coimbatore City Municipal Corporation since 1981.  The growth of Peelamedu during the last decade can be cited due to the growth of the IT sector in Coimbatore. The rapid growth of Peelamedu as a commercial and residential hub could be attributed to its geographical advantage in terms of the connectivity to other parts of the city. It acts as an important hub connecting the rapidly growing business class Information Technology corridor. The Peelamedu area stretches from Nava India to the Coimbatore International Airport near SITRA, encompassing major educational institutions, hospitals, and Industries.

History
The foundation stone for "Peelamedu" was laid in November 11, 1711. It was after much persuasion that the King of Mysore, Kanthirava Narasaraja II, granted a permission to Ganga Naidu and his people to establish the Peelamedu village On 11 November 2011, Peelamedu celebrated the locality's 300th anniversary with special arrangement in schools and colleges and poojas in temples.

Etymology
The name "Peelamedu" is derived from "Poolai Medu". The area with an elevation of 418 metres and Poolai flowers plantation abundant then in 1711, the locality was named as "Poolaimedu".

Geography
Avinashi Road, Coimbatore is maintained by the Highways and Minor Ports Department. This 17-km stretch of road running diagonally across this suburb has become the hub of business for Peelamedu. The other major arterial roads include Kamarajar Road, Fun Mall Road, Gandhimanagar Road, Tidel Park Road and Cheranmangar Road, Sowripalayam Road.

Peelamedu is surrounded by localities such as Pappanaickenpalayam, Uppilipalayam, Singanallur, Varadharajapuram, Gandhimanagar, Vilankurichi, Ganapathymanagar, Chinniampalayam, Kalapatti  and SIHS Colony.

Economy
Major textile and wet grinder industries and a considerable number of foundries and motor/pump industries of the district are also located here. It is the educational hub of Coimbatore, with renowned Medical, Paramedical, Engineering, Arts & Science colleges and many famous schools situated here.

Infrastructure

Avinashi Road Flyover
The corridor begins near the Uppilipalayam Flyover and ends near the Goldwins junction over the Avinashi Road, the most important arterial road in the city bypassing over 12 traffic intersections.

Railway Flyovers
A railway flyover is under construction near Tidel Park. Peelamedu RS Flyover was opened in 2016 to avoid traffic congestion.

Temples 
In the area, Temple like
 Sri kari Varadharaja Perumal temple
 Sri Murugan temple
 Periya Mariamman Temple
 Ashtamsa Varadha Anjaneyar Temple
 Meenakshi Sundareswarar Temple
 Akilandeshwari Temple
 Peelamedu Mariamman Kovil
 Saibaba Temple, Bharathi Colony

Multi-Speciality Hospitals 
 PSG Institute of Medical Sciences & Research
 Kovai Medical Center and Hospital
 Aravind Eye Hospitals
 Lotus Eye Hospital and Institute

Major Malls
Fun Republic Mall

Educational institutions
Peelamedu is a center of education in Coimbatore

Colleges
PSG College of Technology
PSG Institute of Medical Sciences & Research
PSG College of Arts and Science
PSG institute of Management
Sardar Vallabhbhai Patel International School of Textiles & Management
 Coimbatore Medical College
  KMCH Medical College
 Coimbatore Institute of Technology
 Government Polytechnic, Coimbatore
 
 Dr G R Damodaran College of Science
 PSGR Krishnammal College for Women
 S.N.R. Sons College
 Hindusthan College of Arts and Science

Schools 
 PSG Sarvajana Higher Secondary School
 Sri Gopal Naidu Higher Secondary School
 ABC Marticulation Higher Secondary School
 PSG PUBLIC SCHOOLS
 G R Damodaran Schools
 G Ramasamy Naidu Matriculation Higher Secondary School
 GRG Matriculation Higher Secondary School
 National Model Schools
 Shri K K Naidu Higher Secondary School
 Smt D Padmavathi Ammal School
 Geethanjali Matriculation Higher Secondary School

IT Parks 
 Tidel Park Coimbatore
 ELCOT IT Tower [Under Construction]
 ELCOT SEZ
Wipro Technologies

Other Places 
 The South India Textile Research Association
 Suguna Kalyana Mandapam
 Kasthuri Srinivasan Art Gallery
 Coimbatore District Small Industries Association (CODISSIA complex)
 Padmavati Cultural Centre
 Hanudev Infopark

Media & Production House 
 SN Productions [Signature of Creations]
 MR.Local Creations

Coimbatore International Airport

Coimbatore International Airport is the second largest and busiest airport in the state of Tamilnadu is located at Peelamedu.

Connectivity
Peelamedu has easy access to :
 Townhall : Via Avinashi Road and State Bank Road 
 Gandhipuram : Via Western Avinashi Road and Bharathiyar Road
 Coimbatore Integrated Bus Terminus : Via Kamarajar Road and Vellalore Road
 Ukkadam : Via  Western Avinashi Road and Townhall
 Singanallur Bus Terminus : Via Kamarajar Road 
 Railway Station : Via Avinashi Road and State Bank Road
 Coimbatore International Airport : Via Eastern Avinashi Road

Coimbatore Metro
Coimbatore Metro feasibility study is completed and one of the route planned from Ukkadam Bus Terminus to Kaniyur via Peelamedu and Coimbatore International Airport covering 27 km.

Politics 
The locality of Peelamedu is a part of Singanallur (state assembly constituency) and Coimbatore (Lok Sabha constituency).

References 

Neighbourhoods in Coimbatore